Sounds of Silence is a 2006 documentary by Amir Hamz and Mark Lazarz about music in Iran. It was featured at the 2006 Tribeca Film Festival, including music from O-Hum, Barobax, and Hich-Kas.

References

Iranian music
Documentary films about Iran